Franck Rizzetto (born 29 March 1971) is a French former professional footballer who played as a midfielder.

References

External links
 
 

1971 births
Living people
French footballers
Toulouse Fontaines Club players
Montpellier HSC players
Olympique Alès players
FC Metz players
Nîmes Olympique players
AS Cannes players
Rodez AF players
Association football midfielders
Rodez AF managers
Ligue 1 players
Ligue 2 players
French football managers
Paris Saint-Germain F.C. non-playing staff